Impey may refer to:


People

Andy Impey (born 1971), English former footballer
Catherine Impey (1847–1923), British Quaker activist
Chris Impey (born 25 January 1956), British astronomer, educator, and author
Daryl Impey (born 1984), South African professional road cyclist
Edward Impey (born 28 May 1962) British historian, archaeologist, and museum curator 
Elijah Impey (1732–1809), British judge and Chief Justice of Bengal
Jarman Impey (born 1995), Australian Rules Football player
John Impey (born 1954), English footballer and football manager
John Impey (writer) (died 1829), English legal writer
Mary Impey (1749–1818), English natural historian and patron of Bengal arts
Sax Impey (born 1969), Cornish artist
Henry George Impey Siddons (1851–1936), Indian educationist 
Sir Roderick Impey Murchison (1792–1871), Scottish geologist

Other uses
Impey Album, a collection of paintings commissioned by Elijah and Mary Impey
Impey Barbicane, a character in the novel From the Earth to the Moon by Jules Verne
Impey pheasant or Himalayan monal
Impey River, in the Mid West of Western Australia
HMS Impey, a Royal Navy steam yacht, renamed from HMS Imogen

See also